Tumbleweed Tiny House Company is a company in Sonoma, California that designs and builds small houses between , Many are timber-framed homes permanently attached to trailers for mobility. The houses on wheels are available to be purchased ready made and shipped to consumers, and are individually manufactured and customized for their buyers. The company also offers construction plans for their mobile houses and larger designs, as well as workshops geared toward teaching people how to build their own cottage or tiny house on wheels.

Tumbleweed is part of the small house movement. In 2002, Tumbleweed's owner, Jay Shafer, co-founded the Small House Society in Iowa City, Iowa. In 2003, he was commissioned by Gregory Paul Johnson, Small House Society co-founder, to build The Mobile Hermitage, which became one of Tumbleweed's first commercially sold homes.

In the aftermath of Hurricane Katrina, a few were sold to Gulf Coast residents who preferred them to government-supplied temporary housing.

In 2008 the company reported selling only one house per year, though this had increased five-fold in 2009. As of 2011, the company reported building "only a few houses" annually. The majority of the houses built to its designs are constructed by customers using Tumbleweed's plans. In 2012 Jay Shafer left the company to his business partner and founded Four Lights Tiny House Company.

See also
 Sarah Susanka

References

Bibliography

External links
 Official website
 fourlightshouses

Architecture firms based in California
Construction and civil engineering companies of the United States
Companies based in Sonoma County, California
Manufactured home manufacturers